Al-Manshiyya may refer to:
 Al-Manshiyya, a square in central Alexandria, and it refers to the failed assassination attempt against President Gamal Abdel Nasser by a member of the Muslim Brotherhood in October 1954
 Al-Manshiyya, Acre, village depopulated during the 1948 war
 Al-Manshiyya, Jaffa, neighbourhood depopulated during the 1948 war
 Al-Manshiyya, Safad, village depopulated during the 1948 war
 Al-Manshiyya, Tiberias, extension of Ubeidiya, Tiberias or separate hamlet depopulated during the 1948 war
 Al-Manshiyya, Tulkarm, village depopulated during the 1948 war
 Al-Manshiyya, Jenin, small village southwest of Jenin, Palestinian territories
 Iraq al-Manshiyya, village between Gaza and Hebron, depopulated during the 1948 war
 Manshiya Zabda, village in Galilee, Israel

See also
 Place names of Palestine